Polynoncus galapagoensis is a species of hide beetle in the subfamily Omorginae found on the Galapagos Islands.

References

galapagoensis
Beetles described in 1953